Mário Rino Sivieri (15 April 1942 – 3 June 2020) was an Italian-born Brazilian Roman Catholic bishop.

Sivieri was born in Italy and was ordained to the priesthood in 1966. He served as bishop of the Roman Catholic Diocese of Propriá, Brazil, from 1997 to 2017.

Sivieri died of diabetes in Aracaju on 3 June 2020, aged 78.

Notes

1942 births
2020 deaths
21st-century Roman Catholic bishops in Brazil
Italian Roman Catholic bishops in South America
Deaths from diabetes
20th-century Roman Catholic bishops in Brazil
Roman Catholic bishops of Propriá